The Belait people are a Bruneian ethnic group native to Belait District. They traditionally speak the Belait language. They are predominantly Muslim. They are officially one of the seven ethnic groups which make up the Bruneian Malay race.

Origin 
The latter was originally native to Tinjar River, a tributary of the Baram River in Sarawak, Malaysia; they later migrated to the area of, and eventually integrated with, the 'native' Belait.

Language 
The Belait language, the traditional language of the Belait people, is an Austronesian language within the sub-group Malayo-Polynesian. The language is considered "seriously" endangered; it is claimed that there are "almost no younger speakers".

Citations

References 
 
 
 

Ethnic groups in Brunei
Society of Brunei